The NBA playoffs is the postseason tournament of the National Basketball Association (NBA) held to determine the league's champion. An annual best-of-seven elimination tournament, the NBA playoffs are held after the league's regular season and its preliminary postseason tournament, the NBA Play-In Tournament.

Format
Prior to the 2020s, the NBA playoffs were widely regarded to comprise the entirety of the NBA postseason, although some sources suggested the NBA Finals should be regarded as separate. From the 2022–23 NBA season, when an expansion to the postseason implemented during the prior three seasons (including two COVID-shortened seasons) was made permanent, the NBA made it clearly known that the Playoffs were to remain a 4-round, best-of-seven tournament (including the Finals), and that thus qualification criteria for the playoffs and postseason are no longer identical.

The top six teams in both the Eastern Conference and Western Conference, ranked by winning percentage, directly advance to the playoffs. Teams ranked seventh through tenth compete in the NBA Play-In Tournament for the seventh and eighth seeds.

Officially considered separate from the NBA playoffs, the NBA Play-In Tournament uses a modified page playoff format in which the seventh- and eighth-place teams play each other in a qualification game, with the winner being given the opportunity to play as the seventh seed of the playoffs. Meanwhile, the ninth- and tenth-place teams play each other in an elimination game, with the loser being eliminated and the winner playing the loser of the seven-eight game in a final game to determine who earns the eighth playoff seed.

Both conferences conduct the playoffs in the traditional bracket format. All rounds are best-of-seven series. Series are played in the 2–2–1–1–1 format, meaning the team with home-court advantage hosts games 1, 2, 5, and 7, while their opponent hosts games 3, 4, and 6, with games 5, 6 and 7 being played if needed. This format has been used since 2014, after NBA team owners unanimously voted to change the format of the NBA Finals from the 2–3–2 format on October 23, 2013. Once the playoffs start, the bracket is fixed; teams are never "reseeded", unlike in the National Football League (NFL) where the strongest remaining teams face the weakest teams in subsequent rounds.

Tiebreaker criteria 
If two or more teams within the same conference are tied in overall winning percentage, a tiebreaker criteria is used to determine final rankings.

The tiebreaker criteria is used as follows:

 Head-to-head record; better record in games with the tied teams.
 Division record; better record in games against teams in its own division (Only if the teams are in the same division).
 Conference record; better record in game against teams in its own conference.
 Winning percentage against playoff teams in its own conference.
 Winning percentage against playoff teams in the opposing conference.
 Point differential in all games.

Should three or more teams tie, any division leaders are given higher seeds regardless of any other criteria. In addition, once any team is eliminated from a tiebreaker, the criteria goes back to the first step for the remaining teams. Prior to 2016, this rule was also used for two-team ties, but only applied if the two teams have the same head-to-head record.

History
The National Basketball Association was established in 1949 by merger of the Basketball Association of America (BAA) and National Basketball League but it recognizes the three BAA seasons as part of its own history. In all of its three years the BAA champion was finally determined in a best-of-seven series but its first two tournaments, the 1947 and 1948 BAA Playoffs, were otherwise quite different from the third, which 21st-century NBA playoffs nearly match. In 1947 and 1948, the Eastern and Western Division champions were matched in a best-of-seven series following the regular season, whose winner advanced to the championship round. Meanwhile, four runners-up played best-of-three series to determine the other finalist: the two second-place teams were matched in one short series and the two third-place teams in another; the winners of those two series played another one. In 1947, the Philadelphia Warriors won the runners-up bracket and beat the Western champion Chicago Stags four games to one, which the NBA recognizes as its first championship; in 1948 Baltimore won the runners-up and beat Eastern champion Philadelphia in the final. Both tournaments generated one finalist from the Eastern and one from the Western Division, but only by chance.

In 1949, the third and last BAA tournament matched Eastern teams exclusively and Western teams exclusively, necessarily generating Eastern and Western playoff champions to meet in the final. At the same time, the number of playoff teams was increased from three to four from each Division; two rounds of best-of-three series were played, followed by a best-of-seven championship. The main idea was retained by the NBA. Even the 1950 tournament, following a transitional season with three divisions rather than two, initially determined one playoff champion from each division. The Central champion Minneapolis Lakers became the first league champion under the NBA name by defeating Anderson from the West in a best-of-three, with Syracuse from the East idle, and then knocking off the Syracuse Nationals in six games.

The 1951 through 1953 playoffs changed the division finals into a best-of-five playoff. With only nine league members in 1953–54, the NBA cut its postseason tournament field from eight teams to six (from 1954 through 1966, the period of eight to nine league members). Round robins were played in 1954, uniquely in NBA history—a three-team round robin among the three playoff teams in each division. From 1955 to 1966, the first-place team in each division was idle while its two runners-up faced played a best-of-three. Division finals were expanded to best-of-seven in 1958 and division semifinals to best-of-five in 1961.

With ten league members again for the 1966–67 season, eight teams were again admitted to the tournament, providing a simple three-round knockout (8-team bracket). A year later, the division semifinals were changed to best-of-seven playoff.  Then, in 1975 and 1977, respectively, a fifth and sixth team were added to each Division, necessitating an additional first round of best-of-three series.

Finally in 1984, the tournament expanded to its present 16-team, four-round knockout, and the now-complete set of first-round series was expanded to a best-of-five. In 2003 the first round was changed to also be best-of-seven.

Beginning with the 2004 season, with the addition of the thirtieth NBA franchise, the Charlotte Bobcats, the NBA realigned its divisions. The result was that each conference would have three divisions of five teams each, and the winner of each division was guaranteed a top-three playoff seed. This would change slightly after the 2005–06 season; while division winners still receive automatic playoff berths, they are guaranteed a top-four seed, as described below.

2006 NBA playoffs controversy
The playoff format in place for the 2004–05 and 2005–06 NBA playoffs created controversy and would be changed prior to the 2006–07 NBA season.

Prior to 2004, when the NBA was aligned into two conferences with two divisions each, the division champions were guaranteed the top two seeds. This meant that the top two teams in a conference could never meet until the conference finals, assuming they both made it to that round.

After the NBA realigned its two conferences into three divisions each, the seeding rules remained largely unchanged. The top three seeds would now be reserved for division champions. However, this meant that if the top two teams (by record) in a conference were in the same division, they would be seeded first and fourth. Assuming no first-round upsets, this raised the prospect that the top two teams in the conference would face each other in the conference semifinals, instead of the conference finals. In the second year of this format, the 2005–06 NBA season, the two teams with the best records in the Western Conference, the San Antonio Spurs and Dallas Mavericks of the Southwest Division, did just that. This turn of events led to the playoff format being criticized by many.

In August 2006, the NBA announced a rules change. Beginning in the 2006-2007 season, the top four seeds in each conference would be seeded according to their win–loss totals, "guaranteeing that the top two teams in each conference cannot meet until the conference finals".

Timeline
 1947: The playoffs were instituted with a three-stage tournament, similar to the Stanley Cup playoffs of the 1930s; the two first-place teams qualified directly to one semifinal where they played each other in a best-of-7 series.  Teams finishing second & third qualified for the best-of-3 quarterfinals, where the two second-placed teams were paired in one quarterfinal, as were the two third-placed teams, and the two quarterfinal winners played each other in a best-of-three semifinal.  The two semifinal winners played each other in the Basketball Association of America (BAA) best-of-7 final series.

There were no byes, or idle time, for the division champions – as there would be for higher-seeded playoff teams 1955–66 and 1975–83. All six 1947 participants played their first tournament games on Wednesday, April 2; in 1948 the two Eastern runners-up (E2, E3 in the figure) were idle for a few days only because there was a three-way Western tie to break. Both winners of the runners-up bracket, Philadelphia in 1947 and Baltimore in 1948, reached the final series having played fewer tournament games than their final opponents, Chicago in 1947 and Philadelphia in 1948, had played in the best-of-7 pairings of division champions. And both winners of the runners-up bracket won the final series. The "postseason" actually comprised 11 games played in a span of 21 days for the 1947 Chicago Stags and 13 games in 30 days for 1948 Philadelphia Warriors, the finalists who emerged from the pairing of division champions.

 1949: The playoffs were reorganized to match Eastern Division teams exclusively, and Western Division teams exclusively in two halves of the bracket. Thus the BAA tournament generated a playoff champion in each Division. (So did the NBA in each of three 1950 divisions, and so it has done in each half of the league since then.) The top four teams from each of the two divisions qualified.  The quarterfinals and semifinals were renamed division semifinals and division finals, respectively, and both rounds were best-of-3. Thus any playoff team might be eliminated in two games, one home game. The best-of-7 final was unchanged.

 1950: The BAA was renamed as the National Basketball Association (NBA).  With a three-division setup, 12 teams now qualified for the playoffs, with the top four teams from each division meeting in the best-of-3 division semifinals.  The winners met in the best-of-3 division finals.  With three teams remaining, the surviving team with the best regular season record qualified directly for the finals while the other two teams met in a best-of-3 NBA semifinals.

 1951: With the NBA reverting to a two-division setup; the division semifinals reverted to its original 1949 format with only eight teams qualifying.  The division finals was extended to a best-of-5 format.

 1954: With only nine league members (soon to be eight), the number of playoff teams was cut down to six.  The division semifinals was changed to a double round-robin format within the division, with the top three teams from each division qualifying (each team played four games).  Following the round-robin games, the top two teams qualified for the best-of-three division finals, followed by the best-of-seven finals.

 1955: The number of playoff teams remained at six, but the initial round-robin was dropped after one year in favor of giving the first-place team in each division a bye to the best-of-five division finals. Teams which placed second and third played a best-of-three division semifinal. In 1955 the byes provided five and six extra days idle for the first-place teams.
 1958: The division finals was extended to a best-of-seven format.
 1961: The division semifinals were extended to a best-of-five format.

The 1961 to 1966 tournaments alone combined initial byes for the top seeded teams in each division with best-of-five initial series for second and third seeded teams in both divisions. The 1961 byes provided five and seven extra days idle for the first-place teams. By 1966 the schedule provided more rest for the first-round participants with byes of 11 and eight extra days idle.

 1967: The number of playoff teams was expanded to eight once more. The division semifinals now included the fourth-best team in each conference.  The first-placed teams no longer received a bye. They were matched against the third-placed teams in the best-of-5 division semifinals, while the second-placed teams were now matched against the fourth-placed teams.
 1968: The division semifinals was extended to a best-of-seven format.

 1971: With an increased number of teams, the divisions were upgraded into conferences, which were then split into two divisions.  Eight teams still qualified, four from each conference. Hence, the division semifinals and division finals came to be known as conference semifinals and conference finals, respectively. The top two teams in each division qualified as the Eastern Conference, comprising the Atlantic and Central divisions, while the Western Conference consisted of the Midwest and Pacific divisions. The first place team from one division would face the second place team of the other division within their conference. In the conference playoffs, a division winner always held home-court advantage over a second place team regardless of record.

 1973: The playoff format was modified, as only the divisional champions qualified automatically; two wild-cards were also added from each conference. Once qualification was determined, the four qualifiers were seeded 1–4 based on record; divisional position no longer mattered. The No. 1 seed then played No. 4, and No. 2 played No. 3.

 1975: The number of playoff teams was expanded from eight to ten.  A first round was introduced which matched the fourth and fifth seeds in each conference in a best-of-3 first round series, while the top three seeds received a bye. This is similar to the system currently used in the 2012 MLB postseason. Division winners did not automatically receive a bye to the Conference Semifinals.

1977: The number of playoff teams was expanded from 10 to 12.  The first round now included the sixth best team in each conference, which was matched against the third seed.  Only the division winners received byes to the next round. 

The 1983 tournament is the latest to incorporate first-round byes for seeded teams. The first-round best-of-three series tapped off on Tuesday and Wednesday, April 19 and 20; the second-round best-of-sevens on Sunday to the following Wednesday, April 27. Counting from Tuesday the byes provided five to eight extra days idle.

 1984: The playoffs were expanded from 12 teams to 16 teams.  All teams now participated in the first round, which was extended to a best-of-five series.

 2003: The first round was extended to a best-of-seven series. This change arguably benefitted the higher seeds as it reduced the likelihood of an upset by a lower seed. It also meant that a team that swept their series 4–0 might have to wait up to two weeks to play their next series against a team that had won 4–3.

 2005: Each conference was realigned into three divisions with each division winner qualifying for a top-three seed regardless of record.  The next best five teams from each conference also qualify for the playoffs.

 2007: To address the criticisms of having each division champion guaranteed a top-three seed, regardless of record, the rules were changed such that the division winners are now only guaranteed a top-four seed.  The team with the second-best record in the conference is now guaranteed the second seed, even if it finishes second in its own division.  This ensures that the two best teams in the conference will not meet until the conference finals at the earliest.  The previous system raised the prospect of the two best teams in the conference being seeded 1 and 4 if they play in the same division, thus forcing them to play each other in the second round (given no upsets).
 Note: In the example below, both the East's No. 2 seed and the West's No. 3 seed are not division champions.

 2016: While the playoff bracketing did not change, qualification criteria were changed. The teams with the eight best records in each conference receive playoff berths, with no automatic berths or guaranteed top-four seed placement for division champions.
 Note: In the example below, both the East's No. 7 seed and the West's No. 5 seed are division champions.

 2020: Beginning in 2020, play-in games were used to determine the final qualified team(s) in the first round of the NBA playoffs.

In the 2020 play-in format, if the ninth-place team within a conference finished the regular season within four games of the eighth-place team, they would compete in a postseason play-in series. This format was used only in the Western Conference, as the No. 9 Memphis Grizzlies finished within a half-game of the No. 8 Portland Trail Blazers. Described as a best-of-two series, the Trail Blazers, needing only one win as the higher seed, eliminated the Grizzlies in game one to advance to the playoffs.

 2021: In 2021, the format for the play-in games was finalized.

In 2021, the top six teams in each conference advance to the playoffs, while seventh- through tenth-placed teams qualified for a play-in tournament. The seventh- and eighth-place teams got up to two chances to win one game to qualify for the playoffs, while the ninth- and tenth-place teams needed to win two consecutive games to advance. The play-in games would become a permanent part of the postseason starting in 2023.

W1 is Winner of 7/8 game 
L1 is Loser of 7/8 game 
W2 is Winner of 9/10 game 
W3 is Winner of W2 / L1 game.

Team rosters
Playoff teams must identify their postseason rosters before the playoffs begin. They are allowed up to 15 players each and can designate two players as inactive for each game. Players are eligible to be on a team's playoff roster as long as they were on the team for at least one regular season game, and were not on another NBA team's roster after March 1. Prior to the 2005-06 season, playoff rosters were limited to 12 players who were named before the playoffs began.

Records and statistics
 Only five 8th seeded teams have managed to win a series versus the number 1 seeded team:  The Denver Nuggets eliminated the Seattle SuperSonics 3–2 in 1994. The New York Knicks eliminated the Miami Heat 3–2 in 1999. The Golden State Warriors defeated the Dallas Mavericks 4–2 in the 2007 Western Conference First Round (becoming the first 8 seed to beat a 1 seed in the best of 7 formats). In 2011, the Memphis Grizzlies beat the San Antonio Spurs, 4–2 and in 2012, the Philadelphia 76ers beat the Chicago Bulls 4–2 following a torn ACL to star Derrick Rose.
 The 1999 Knicks are the only 8th seeded team to reach the NBA finals; no 8th seeded team has won the NBA championship as of 2022.
 The 1956–57 St. Louis Hawks, 1958–59 Minneapolis Lakers and the 1980–81 Houston Rockets are the only teams with losing records (34–38, 33–39 and 40–42, respectively) to make it to the NBA finals. In 1981, the Houston Rockets' opponent in the Western Conference Finals, the Kansas City Kings, also had a losing record (40–42). All three of these teams lost to the Boston Celtics in the finals.
 The 1994–95 Houston Rockets, a sixth seed with a record of 47–35, are the lowest seeded team to win the NBA finals. In the NBA finals, the Rockets swept the Orlando Magic (57–25) in four games; in doing so, the Rockets defeated four teams that had won 50 or more games during the regular season (the Utah Jazz at 60–22, the Phoenix Suns at 59–23, the San Antonio Spurs at 62–20 and Orlando at 57–25), the first time a team had done so. As of now, the 1994–95 Rockets are the only team to have won an NBA title without having home-court advantage during any round of the playoffs.
 The Golden State Warriors own the longest NBA playoff winning streak for a single postseason with 15 straight wins in the 2017 playoffs.  
 Of all the teams with multiple NBA finals appearances, the Chicago Bulls are the only team to have never lost in the finals, winning six.
 The Boston Celtics and Los Angeles/Minneapolis Lakers possess the most overall NBA finals series wins with 17 each. The Celtics have played in 21 NBA Finals series, with an overall record of 17–4, while the Lakers have played in the most NBA Finals series (32), with an overall record of 17–15.
 The longest active playoff appearance streak currently belongs to the Boston Celtics with 8 consecutive appearances in the playoffs, beginning in the 2014–15 NBA season. The longest streak of playoffs appearances in a row is currently tied at 22 seasons between the San Antonio Spurs, who made it from 1997–98 season until the 2018–19 season, and the Syracuse Nationals/Philadelphia 76ers, who made it from the 1949–50 season to the 1970–71 season.
As of the 2021–22 season, the longest playoff drought belongs to the Sacramento Kings, who have not made the playoffs since the 2005–06 season.
 In 1983, under the bye–7–7–7 system, the Philadelphia 76ers attained the best record of 12–1, having only lost in Game 4 of the Eastern Conference Finals against the Milwaukee Bucks.
 In 2001, under the best of 5–7–7–7 system, the Los Angeles Lakers attained the best record of 15–1, having only lost in Game 1 of the Finals against the Philadelphia 76ers.
 In 2017, under the best of 7–7–7–7 system, the Golden State Warriors attained the best record of 16–1, having only lost in Game 4 of the Finals against the Cleveland Cavaliers. The Warriors and Cavaliers came into the Finals with a combined record of 24–1, with the Cavaliers having only lost in Game 3 of the Eastern Conference Finals against the Boston Celtics.
 The top four seeded teams all advanced to the Conference Semi-Finals round in 1980, 1986, 1997, 2002, 2004, 2008, 2019 and 2022.

Playoff appearances
Current as of the 2022 NBA playoffs

Appearances by active teams

All-time NBA playoffs table 
The all-time NBA playoffs table is an overall record of all match results of every team that has played in playoffs since the 1946–47 season. The table is accurate as of the end of the 2022 NBA playoffs. Bold indicates the highest number.

See also
NBA Conference Finals
NBA Finals
NBA G League
List of NBA G League champions
List of NBA playoff series

References

External links
 NBA official website
 Playoff Seeding Criteria NBA.com
 NBA Playoffs InsideHoops.com coverage
 Basketball-Reference.com Index of NBA playoffs seasons

 
Recurring sporting events established in 1947